Nina in the Mix: The Dense Modesto Remixes is the first remix album by Filipino singer Nina, and the second by DJ Dense Modesto. It was released in the Philippines on October 31, 2007 by Club Myx, in collaboration with Warner Music Philippines. After the success of Sitti in the Mix: The Dense Modesto Remixes, Warner and the Club Myx record label decided to team up for the second time to release another Dense Modesto remix album, this time approaching the pop-R&B influenced Nina. The album's concept is a "ride in the air," forming the sound of an airplane flight. The album includes dance remixes of her notable hits such as "Jealous", "Foolish Heart", "I Don't Want to Be Your Friend", and "Through the Fire".

The album was made available on digital download through iTunes on December 11, 2007.

Release and reception 
Without any promotion and participation from Nina, the album was able to enter the top 10 of retailer charts in the Philippines. It also received generally positive reviews from critics and listeners, with Lorelie Dino of Titik Pilipino, stating "It may have been a slow start, but Dense Modesto worked it up in gaining momentum, and the album ends off greatly." She was impressed with "Through the Fire (Street Shoe)", "Jealous (Alternate)", and "Someday (Rain Cloud)", saying "I find the latter ones more superior." However, she thought the Nina's name caught the attention more than the "Dense Modesto remixes" title, explaining "You can mistake the album as being Nina's rather than the remixes that they are." She ended up giving the album four out of five stars.

An unofficial music video for "Someday" (Future Confessional Remix) was created and aired on MYX to advertise the album and help it increase in sales. Other adverts of the album were posted on DJ Dense Modesto's official Multiply page.

Track listing 
 "Intro: Modesto Air" – 0:29
 "Someday" (Future Confessional Remix) – 4:52
 "Through the Fire" (Amber Club Remix) – 4:46
 "Love Is Contagious" (Prescription Remix) – 7:11
 "Heaven" (Angel 31 Remix) – 4:47
 "I Can't Make You Love Me" (Love Like Club Remix) – 4:54
 "Jealous" (12:16 Club Remix) – 4:44
 "Loving You" (Catwalk Bliss Remix) – 5:21
 "Sunlight" (8/20 Remix) – 4:37
 "Foolish Heart" (Closure Lounge Remix) – 4:23
 "I Don't Want to Be Your Friend" (1800BYEMYLUV Remix) – 5:53
 "Interlude: Through the Fire" (Street Shoe Remix) – 2:47
 "I Do" (VP Stomp Remix) – 4:10
 "Interlude: Jealous" (Alternate Remix) – 2:33
 "Outro: Someday" (Raincloud Remix) – 1:54

Personnel 
 Jim Baluyut - executive producer
 Anne Poblador - album producer
 Nina Girado - lead vocals, back-up vocals
 DJ Dense Modesto - remixing

Sales

Release history

References 

Nina Girado albums
2007 remix albums
Warner Music Group remix albums
Warner Music Philippines albums